Ross Mayfield is an American Silicon Valley technology entrepreneur. He is the co-founder and CEO of Pingpad. The former CEO of Socialtext, and former Vice President of Business Development of SlideShare. He is also a regular blogger and public speaker.

Biography 
Mayfield received a Bachelor of Arts degree in political science from the University of California, Los Angeles (UCLA) and completed the Management Development for Entrepreneurs (MDE) program at the UCLA Anderson School of Management.

He began his career in the nonprofit sector with the U.S.-Baltic Foundation, after which he moved to Estonia and served as a scriptwriter for, and advisor to, the Office of the President of Estonia. He also served as marketing director of Levicom, one of the largest privately held telecom groups in Eastern Europe, where he also started an Internet service provider and a web design company.

In 1998 he was hired by RateXchange, a business-to-business commodity exchange for telecom, where he quickly progressed from vice president of sales and marketing to chief operating officer and then to president. With the collapse of the dot-com bubble, the company, which had yet to earn any revenue, saw its billion dollar valuation vanish overnight. Ross left in August 2000.

He then served as VP of marketing for Lucida Inc., a Fujitsu spinout, before co-founding Socialtext in 2002.

Ross hosted the first Barcamp in 2005 at Socialtext.

In 2012, Mayfield sold his two companies within the same week, Socialtext to Bedford Funding/Peoplefluent and SlideShare to LinkedIn.

References

 http://www.businessweek.com/technology/content/oct2004/tc20041019_0375_tc182.htm
 http://online.wsj.com/article/SB109105974578777189.html
 https://www.nytimes.com/2003/05/19/technology/19NECO.html
 https://www.nytimes.com/2006/06/17/technology/17wiki.html
 https://web.archive.org/web/20090520062815/http://www.redherring.com/Home/pages/print/posts/?bid=f24e10f3-dbae-436b-b6b4-93fbb30b3d8b&mode=Full

External links

 Ross Mayfield's Blog
 Company website
 Many2Many, a group blog on social Software that Mayfield contributes to
 71MB and 24MB QuickTime movies of Ross Mayfield lecturing on emergent democracy and group forming networks at Stanford in 2005, licensed under Creative Commons, hosted by the Internet Archive

Year of birth missing (living people)
Living people
American computer businesspeople
American bloggers
University of California, Los Angeles alumni
People from Palo Alto, California
American expatriates in Estonia
American technology chief executives
UCLA Anderson School of Management alumni